Vittorio Sanipoli (1915–1992) was an Italian stage, film and television actor. He appeared in around a hundred films and television series between 1942 and 1980.

Life and career
Born Luciano Sanipoli in Genoa, he made his acting debut in 1939 in the Roman Calò's stage company Society of Mystery Shows.  Quite soon he was cast in leading roles in dramas, achieving popularity and critical appreciation after World War II for his performances in Detective Story and Anne of the Thousand Days (both represented in 1951) and winning a San Genesio Award in 1957, for his performance in Virginio Puecher's Il Revisore.

Sanipoli made his film debut in 1942, starring in two adventure films based on Emilio Salgari's novels, Il figlio del Corsaro Rosso and Gli ultimi filibustieri, under the stage name Vittorio Sanni.  After war, he continued his  film career with dozens of  roles, even if mainly consisting of supporting or character roles. While most of his performances were in Italy, he also worked on a number of co-productions with France such as La Reine Margot (1954).

Sanipoli also had an intense career in television, being a quite regular presence in high-profile RAI series and TV movies. He also worked on radio and as a voice actor.

Sanipoli was married to stage actress Amalia D'Alessio.

Selected filmography

 La morte civile (1942) - Giulio, fratello di Rosalia
 The Son of the Red Corsair (1943) - Enrico di Ventimiglia
 Gli ultimi filibustieri (1943) - Enrico di Ventimiglia
 In High Places (1945) - Roberto
 O sole mio (1946)
 The Courier of the King (1947) - Luz
 La revanche de Baccarat (1947) - Arnaud, comte de Chamery
 Rocambole (1947) - Arnaud, comte de Chamery
 The White Devil (1947) - John
 Cuore (1948)
 Letter at Dawn (1948) - Enrico Veri
 Biancaneve e i sette ladri (1949)
 Torment (1950) - Rossi, un socio di Carlo
 Cavalcade of Heroes (1950) - Ottavio Monis
 Turri il bandito (1950)
 The Transporter (1950) - Johnny
 Song of Spring (1951) - Max
 Fugitive in Trieste (1951)
 Last Meeting (1951) - Augusto, il ricattatore
 Revenge of Black Eagle (1951) - Principe Boris Yuravleff
 The Reluctant Magician (1951)
 Vedi Napoli e poi muori (1951) - Roberto Sanesi
 The Woman Who Invented Love (1952) - Caddulo
 Milady and the Musketeers (1952)
 Son of the Hunchback (1952) - Conte Zeno
 Ragazze da marito (1952) - Commendator Spadoni (voice, uncredited)
 Il romanzo della mia vita (1952) - Gianni Maggini
 La trappola di fuoco (1952) - Ernesto
 Amore rosso (Marianna Sirca) (1952) - Sebastiano (voice, uncredited)
 Good Folk's Sunday (1953) - Avvocato Conti
 Sins of Rome (1953) - Marcus Virilius Rufus
 Gioventù alla sbarra (1953)
 Una donna prega (1953) - Gérard
 Too Young for Love (1953) - Sergio
 Neapolitans in Milan (1953) - Giovanni, capo operaio
 The Pagans (1953) - Tancredi Serra
 Past Lovers (1953) - Carlo
 Touchez pas au grisbi (1954) - Ramon
 Touchez pas au grisbi (1954) - Ramon
 Le Chevalier de Maison-Rouge (1954) - Maximilian Loris, Chevalier de Maison Rouge
 Modern Virgin (1954) - Vittorio
 Queen Margot (1954) - Maurevel, le chef de la police
 Napoli piange e ride (1954) - Maestro Michele Blasi
 Roland the Mighty (1956) - Gano di Maganza
 La donna del giorno (1957) - Il commissario
 Addio per sempre! (1958)
 The Great War (1959) - Maggiore Venturi
 Constantine and the Cross  (1961) - Apuleius
 Sword of the Conqueror (1961) - Wolfango
 The Mongols (1961) - (uncredited)
 Morte di un bandito (1961) - Carmelo
 Colossus of the Arena (1962) - Slave Chief
 Violenza segreta (1963) - Farnenti - un proprietario di bananeti
 Slave Girls of Sheba (1963) - Sheik Selim
 Maigret Sees Red (1963) - Pozzo
 The Organizer (1963) - Baudet
 Son of the Circus (1963) - Gillo Antares
 Il vendicatore mascherato (1964)
 Agent 077: From the Orient with Fury (1965) - Vardar
 Vacanze sulla neve (1966)
 Estouffade à la Caraïbe (1967) - Kosta
 Roma Bene (1971) - Il Questore
 Ten Days' Wonder (1971) - Commissaire
 We Are All in Temporary Liberty (1971) - Questor
 The Hassled Hooker (1972) - Attorney General
 Pianeta Venere (1972)
 Les hommes (1973) - Grisoni
 Cry of a Prostitute (1974) - Don Cascemi
 Three Tough Guys (1974) - Mike Petralia
 Le guêpier (1976) - Fossetti

References

External links

1915 births
1992 deaths
Italian male film actors
Italian male stage actors
Italian male television actors
Actors from Genoa
20th-century Italian male actors
Italian male radio actors
Italian male voice actors